is a rechargeable contactless smart card ticketing system for public transport in Sapporo, Japan. Sapporo City Transportation Bureau (SCTB) introduced the system from January 30, 2009.

The integrated service with Kitaca, a smart card system by JR Hokkaidō, was initially considered, but they decided to introduce the different systems because of the technical and financial difficulties. The two operators initially hoped to start an integrated service,  but as of February 2020 Sapica still can not be used on JR services.

While using the same FeliCa chip as Suica and Kitaca, SCTB intentionally uses a different system code and encryption key to break compatibility to avoid JR East licensing fees.

From 2001 to 2004, Sapporo Municipal Subway experimented a different smart card called .

Usable area

As of its introduction on January 30, 2009, the card is usable on Sapporo Municipal Subway Lines, as well as on the Sapporo Streetcar, Hokkaido Chuo Bus, JR Hokkaido Bus and Jotetsu Buses. SAPICA can also be used as a payment card at participating stores and vending machines.

Types of cards
Unregistered SAPICA: For adults only.
Registered SAPICA: For adults and children. A card can be reissued when a user lost it.
SAPICA commuter's pass: For adults and children, with registrations.

References

External links 

 Official website
 Official website
 Sapporo Information Network Company

Fare collection systems in Japan
Sapporo Municipal Subway
Contactless smart cards
Smart cards introduced in 2009